Love on Ice is a 1950 West German romance film directed by Kurt Meisel and starring Margot Hielscher, Kurt Meisel and Hannelore Bollmann. It also features the ice hockey teams SC Riessersee and EV Füssen. It was shot at the Bavaria Studios in Munich. The film's sets were designed by the art directors Robert Herlth, Max Mellin and Willy Schatz.

Cast
 Margot Hielscher as Angelika Langhoff
 Kurt Meisel as Toni Staudtner
 Charlotte Witthauer as Charlotte Pappke
 Hannelore Bollmann as Jeanette Bergmann
 Friedrich Schoenfelder as Birger Sörensen
 Kurt Waitzmann as Kurt Frischauf
 Hubert von Meyerinck as Hoteldirektor Schabratzky
 Rudolf Schündler as Dr. Siegfried Bergmann
 Gunther Philipp as Max
 Heinz Erhardt as Fabrikant Meyer
 Peter Wolf as Peter Langhoff
 Sepp Nigg as Heini
 Otto Friebel as Otto
 Hans Stadtmüller as Portier

References

Bibliography 
 Hans-Michael Bock and Tim Bergfelder. The Concise Cinegraph: An Encyclopedia of German Cinema. Berghahn Books, 2009.

External links 
 

1950 films
1950s romance films
German romance films
West German films
1950s German-language films
Films directed by Kurt Meisel
Films shot at Bavaria Studios
1950s sports films
German ice hockey films
German black-and-white films
1950s German films